The canton of Lizy-sur-Ourcq is a French former administrative division, located in the arrondissement of Meaux, in the Seine-et-Marne département (Île-de-France région). It was disbanded following the French canton reorganisation which came into effect in March 2015. It consisted of 22 communes, which joined the canton of La Ferté-sous-Jouarre in 2015.

Demographics

Composition 
The canton of Lizy-sur-Ourcq was composed of 22 communes:

Armentières-en-Brie
Cocherel
Congis-sur-Thérouanne
Coulombs-en-Valois
Crouy-sur-Ourcq
Dhuisy
Douy-la-Ramée
Étrépilly
Germigny-sous-Coulombs
Isles-les-Meldeuses
Jaignes
Lizy-sur-Ourcq
Marcilly
Mary-sur-Marne
May-en-Multien
Ocquerre
Le Plessis-Placy
Puisieux
Tancrou
Trocy-en-Multien
Vendrest
Vincy-Manœuvre

See also
Cantons of the Seine-et-Marne department
Communes of the Seine-et-Marne department

References

Lizy sur ourcq
2015 disestablishments in France
States and territories disestablished in 2015